The Spotsylvania Towne Centre (formerly Spotsylvania Mall) is a mall located in Spotsylvania County, Virginia, on Virginia State Route 3, less than a mile west of Interstate 95, and directly across from the Central Park shopping and dining complex. The mall is owned and developed by Cafaro Company.  The property was renamed as "Spotsylvania Towne Centre" at the beginning of a $12 million
renovation project.  The project, completed in 2009, included an extensive remodeling of the mall's interior and exterior.  At the same time, construction was begun on an outdoor lifestyle center called "The Village." The mall's anchor stores are Guitar Center, Dick's Sporting Goods, Belk, Costco, JCPenney, and Macy's. There is 1 vacant anchor that was once Sears. The Splitsville Bowling Alley is connected to a movie theater. The mall also houses over 150 specialty stores and restaurants.

History

Spotsylvania Mall opened in 1980 with Leggett (now Belk), JCPenney, Sears, and Montgomery Ward as its anchor stores, as well as an F.W. Woolworth Company dime store as a junior anchor. Hecht's was added in 1993, the same year in which Woolworth closed. JCPenney opened an auxiliary store in the former Woolworth space. Montgomery Ward closed in 2001 and was demolished to make way for a Costco a year later. A Dick's Sporting Goods was also added in 2002. On November 7, 2019, it was announced that Sears would be closing this location a part of a plan to close 96 stores nationwide. The store closed on February 2, 2020, It was subsequently demolished in October 2020.

The Village

Coincidentally with the remodeling of the mall, Cafaro announced plans to develop  of outdoor retail space on vacant land adjoining Spotsylvania Towne Center.  On October 22, 2008, Cafaro announced that eight tenants had signed agreements to lease space in The Village. 

Development plans for The Village included the Muviville Entertainment Complex which will feature a "theater, bowling alley, restaurant and electronic gaming complex". While the movie theater was part of early plans for The Village, its construction appeared doubtful when, in 2009 the developer, Muvico Theaters, was unable to make payments on a $55 Million debt. The center has since opened as Splitsville and the 12 screen Paragon Theaters Village + Extreme.

References

External links
Mall website

Shopping malls in Virginia
Shopping malls established in 1980
Cafaro Company
Tourist attractions in Spotsylvania County, Virginia
Buildings and structures in Spotsylvania County, Virginia
1980 establishments in Virginia